Gwenda Mary Hawkes ( Glubb, previously Janson and Stewart; 1 June 1894 – 27 May 1990) was notable as an ambulance driver in World War I and later as a motor racing driver and speed record holder.

Early life 
Gwenda Mary Glubb was born in 1894 in Fulwood, Lancashire, to Major General Sir Frederic Manley Glubb and Frances Letitia Glubb, née Bagot.

War record 
Gwenda's father was an officer in the British Army who fought in the Boer Wars, and later became Chief Engineer of the British Second Army in World War I. Her brother, John Bagot Glubb, also a British soldier who fought in World War I, became known as Glubb Pasha as commander of the Arab Legion from 1939 until 1956 - Pasha being an Arab honorary title.

Gwenda herself served during World War I as an ambulance driver, and as a result of her skill and endeavours on both the Russian Front and Rumanian Front from 1914 to 1918, she was awarded both the Cross of St. George and the Cross of St. Stanislaus and was also mentioned in despatches.

Motor-cycle racing 
Following her marriage to Colonel Sam Janson, a director of the Spyker car company, on 17 February 1920 in Brompton, Gwenda became interested in motor-cycle racing, competing in events at Brooklands.

In the winter of 1921, Gwenda established the 1000-mile record on a Ner-A-Car motor-cycle and in 1922 took the Double-12-hour record at Brooklands on a Trump-JAP.

Gwenda spent time away from home whilst participating in motor-cycling events, and the close relationship that she developed with Colonel Neil Stewart, who was involved with the company who provided her motor-cycles, resulted in Janson divorcing her in 1923.

Gwenda and Stewart married, and, as a result of night-time restrictions on the use of the circuit at Brooklands interfering with Glenda's motor-cycle record breaking activities, the pair moved to France to be closer to the unrestricted circuit at Montlhéry. At the Montlhéry circuit, Gwenda broke the world 24-hour motor-cycle speed record on a Terrot-JAP.

At Montlhéry, Gwenda met Douglas Hawkes, who became one of her mechanics.

Motor-car racing 
Douglas Hawkes was a director of the Derby engine and car company and was able to source a Miller Special from the United States. In the period between 1930 and 1933, in the Miller-derived car specially prepared by Derby and designated as a Derby-Miller, Gwenda broke the one-mile speed record several times at Montlhéry.

Gwenda also competed on two occasions, with little success, in the 24 Hours of Le Mans event, at the wheel of a Derby car using a Maserati engine. In 1935 she became the fastest woman ever at Brooklands, with a lap speed of 135.95 miles per hour which bettered the previous lap record set by Kay Petre.

Gwenda's affair with Douglas Hawkes resulted in her divorce from Stewart, and her marriage in 1937 to Hawkes as her third husband.

Later life 
In 1940, after the start of the World War II (WWII), Gwenda and Douglas Hawkes moved to England, where Mrs Hawkes took up work in an armaments factory to help the war effort.

After World War II, they moved to the small Greek island of Poros.

Douglas Hawkes died in 1974, and Gwenda died in May 1990, aged 95.

References 

1894 births
1990 deaths
Brooklands people
24 Hours of Le Mans drivers
English racing drivers
English female racing drivers
Sportspeople from Preston, Lancashire